Mesopedinella is a genus of heterokonts.

It includes a single species, Mesopedinella arctica.

References

Dictyochophyceae
Monotypic algae genera
Heterokont genera